Garcinia scortechinii is a species of flowering plant in the family Clusiaceae. It is a tree found in Peninsular Malaysia and Singapore.

References

scortechinii
Trees of Malaya
Least concern plants
Taxonomy articles created by Polbot